"I Love This Bar" is a song co-written and recorded by American country music artist Toby Keith.  It was released in August 2003 as the first single from his 2003 album Shock'n Y'all.  The song reached number one on the US Billboard Hot Country Singles & Tracks chart, keeping the top spot for five weeks. Keith wrote this song with Scotty Emerick.

The song's title inspired a chain of restaurants owned by Keith named Toby Keith's I Love This Bar & Grill.

Content
The narrator describes his favorite bar and the people who frequent it.

Critical reception
Ray Waddell, of Billboard magazine reviewed the song favorably, calling it a "beer-joint staple for years to come.""

Music video
The video for this song was filmed at a bar in Chatsworth, California called The Cowboy Palace Saloon. It was directed by Michael Salomon, and premiered on CMT on August 21, 2003.

Chart performance
"I Love This Bar" debuted at number 30 on the U.S. Billboard Hot Country Singles & Tracks for the week of August 30, 2003.  The song has sold 1,033,000 copies in the U.S. as of April 2014.

Year-end charts

Covers
In 2006, this song was covered by Sammy Hagar for his album Livin' It Up!.

"I Love NASCAR"
On his 2004 album Bipolar and Proud, country music parodist Cledus T. Judd recorded a parody titled "I Love NASCAR". This parody peaked at number 48 on the Billboard Hot Country Singles & Tracks charts. Although the song featured a guest vocal from Keith, he did not receive chart credit for it.

References

External links
 

2003 singles
Toby Keith songs
Songs about alcohol
Songs written by Scotty Emerick
Music videos directed by Michael Salomon
Songs written by Toby Keith
Song recordings produced by James Stroud
DreamWorks Records singles
2003 songs